Kasba Lake Airport  is located next to Kasba Lake, Northwest Territories, Canada.

References

Registered aerodromes in the North Slave Region